The Penn–Princeton football rivalry is an American college football rivalry between the Penn Quakers and Princeton Tigers.

History
Princeton won the first 28 contests in this rivalry that started in 1876. It is the 5th oldest football rivalry in the Ivy League. (Columbia-Yale:1872; Princeton-Yale:1873; Columbia-Princeton:1874; Harvard-Yale: 1875; Penn-Princeton:1876; Columbia-Princeton:1877; Harvard-Princeton:1877; Columbia-Penn:1878; Penn-Yale:1879; Brown-Yale:1880; Harvard-Penn:1881; Dartmouth-Harvard:1882 and Dartmouth-Yale:1884). Penn's first victory over Princeton was in 1892 and after another Penn victory in 1894, the contest was suspended until 1935. Since the resumption of the series Penn has won 41 games and Princeton has won 39 games with one game ending in a tie (1942). Since the Ivy League was officially formed in 1956 Princeton has won 33 games and Penn has won 32 games. Penn and Princeton have played 112 times since 1876. Beginning in 2018 Penn and Princeton will play against each other in the final game of the season.

Game results

See also 
 List of NCAA college football rivalry games
 List of most-played college football series in NCAA Division I
 Penn–Princeton men's basketball rivalry

References

College football rivalries in the United States
Penn Quakers football
Princeton Tigers football